The Nagarakretagama or Nagarakṛtāgama, also known as Desawarnana or Deśavarṇana, is an Old Javanese eulogy to Hayam Wuruk, a Javanese king of the Majapahit Empire.  It was written on lontar as a kakawin by Mpu Prapanca in 1365 (1287 Saka year).  The Nagarakretagama contains detailed descriptions of the Majapahit Empire during its greatest extent.  The poem affirms the importance of Hindu–Buddhism in the Majapahit empire by describing temples and palaces and several ceremonial observances.

The manuscript
In 1894, the Dutch East Indies launched a military expedition against the Cakranegara royal house of Lombok. That year, the Dutch took the manuscript as part of the valuable Lombok treasure, war-booty from the destroyed palace of Mataram-Cakranagara in Lombok. He accompanied the KNIL expedition to Lombok in 1894, and is credited with saving the valuable manuscripts collection of the Lombok royal library from being burnt in the chaos of the battle. A generation of Dutch scholars participated in translating the poem.

Much of its historical value was due to its having been the product of priestly activities directed at enhancing the magical powers of the ruler at the time.  The manuscript is written on lontar leaves.  It was held in the library of Leiden University in the Netherlands, with inventory code number L Or 5.023.

After its translation in the early 20th century, the Nagarakretagama became an inspiration and foundation of the Indonesian independence movement.

In 1970 during the state visit of President Suharto to the Netherlands, the manuscript was given back to Indonesia. Today it is held by the National Library of Indonesia, with inventory code number NB 9. In May 2008 UNESCO recognised the significance of the Nagarakretagama by naming it "The Memory of the World - Regional Register for Asia/Pacific", and finally registered it in 2013.

Descriptions of the Majapahit realm

Historians have examined the poem for what it reveals of political history.  In the canto 13 to 14, the poet Prapanca named several states within today's Indonesian borders. This suggested that those areas were within Majapahit spheres of influence.  Prapanca said the states were subsumed by Majapahit or were vassal states.

In Canto 13, several lands on Sumatra are mentioned, and some possibly correspond to contemporary areas: Jambi, Palembang, Teba (Muaro Tebo), and Dharmasraya. Also mentioned are Kandis, Kahwas, Minangkabau, Siak, Rokan, Kampar and Pane, Kampe, Haru (Aru Kingdom in coastal North Sumatra, today around Medan) and Mandailing. Tamiyang (Aceh Tamiang Regency), negara Perlak (Peureulak) and Padang Lawas, are noted in the west, together with Samudra (Samudra Pasai) and Lamuri, Batan (Bintan), Lampung, and Barus. Also listed are the states of Tanjungnegara (believed to be on Borneo): Kapuas Katingan, Sampit, Kota Lingga, Kota Waringin, Sambas, and Lawas.

In Canto 14 several lands on Borneo (and Philippines) are mentioned: Kadandangan, Landa, Samadang, Tirem, Sedu (Sarawak), Barune (Brunei), Kalka, Saludung (Manila), Solot (Sulu), Pasir, Barito, Sawaku, Tabalung, Tanjung Kutei and Malano.And also in Hujung Medini (and Singapore): Pahang, Langkasuka, Saimwang, Kelantan, Trengganu, Johor, Paka, Muar, Dungun, Tumasik (where Singapore is today), Kelang (Klang Valley), Kedah, Jerai (Gunung Jerai), and Kanjapiniran.

Also in Canto 14 are territories east of Java: Badahulu and Lo Gajah (part of today's Bali). Gurun and Sukun, Taliwang, Sapi (Sape town, east end of Sumbawa island, by the Sape Strait) and Dompo, Sang Hyang Api, Bima. Hutan Kadali (Buru island). Gurun island, and Lombok Merah. Together with prosperous Sasak (central, north and east Lombok) are already ruled. Bantayan with Luwu. Further east are Udamakatraya (Sangir and Talaud). Also mentioned are Makassar, Buton, Banggai, Kunir, Galiao with Selayar, Sumba, Solot, Muar. Also Wanda(n) (Banda island), Ambon or Maluku islands, Kai-islands (Ewab Ohoi-Ewur Mas-Il Larvul-Ngabal-istiadat), Wanin (Onin peninsula, today Fakfak Regency, West Papua), Sran (It could refer Sran which was based in Patimunin, Adi Island, and the city of Kaimana, West Papua or more commonly to Seram Island), Timor and other islands.

Description of Majapahit capital

The manuscript describes the capital city of Majapahit. According to the account of Prapanca in the Nagarakretagama poem, the royal compound was surrounded by a thick, high wall of red brick. Nearby was the fortified guard post. The main gate into the palace was located in the north wall, and was entered through huge doors of decorated iron. Outside the north gate was a long building where courtiers met once a year, a market place, and a sacred crossroads. Just inside the north gate was a courtyard containing religious buildings. On the western side of this courtyard were pavilions surrounded by canals where people bathed. At the south end a gate led to rows of houses set on terraces in which palace servants lived. Another gate led to a third courtyard crowded with houses and a great hall for those waiting to be admitted into the ruler's presence. The king's own quarters, which lay to the east of this courtyard, had pavilions on decorated red brick bases, ornately carved wooden pillars, and a roof decorated with clay ornaments. Outside the palace were quarters for Shiva priests, Buddhists, and other members of the nobility. Further away, and separated from the palace by open fields, were more royal compounds, including that of the chief minister Gajah Mada.

Accounts of ceremonies

In the poem, Prapanca recounted Hayam Wuruk's religious observances in the Candi Singhasari, in which he entered the sanctuary and performed the puspa ceremony for his great-grandfather Kertanegara. After the visit, he went to Kagenengan to perform worship to the founder of the Singhasari kingdom, Rajasa.

Prapanca told details of the sraddha ceremony, performed to honour the soul of a deceased. He described specifically the ceremony for the Queen Grandmother's soul, Gayatri Rajapatni, who had died twelve years earlier. In the canto 63, stanza 4, Prapanca narrated the preparation of the ceremony by the court artisans.  During the ceremony, lion thrones were erected, where priests placed a flower effigy (puspa) symbolising the soul of the Queen Grandmother. The descent of the soul to earth and its final placement in the puspa were narrated in canto 64, stanza 5.

The ceremony lasted for seven days. Colorful pageants crowded the main courtyard. The whole ceremony was performed to please the Rajapatni's soul in hopes that her favour would shine on the reign of her descendants. The posthumous ceremony continued and the king ordered the repair of the Kamal Pundak sanctuary to enact a new holy shrine (candi) for the Queen Grandmother, deified as the Prajnaparamita.

Characters and practices
Nagarakretagama was written as a puja sastra, a genre of Old Javanese literature of adoration and reverence, directed mainly to King Hayam Wuruk. Prapanca did not shy away to express his admiration, even bordering somewhat a cult, since he often invoked a divine quality of the king and his royal family. Nevertheless, the work seems to be independent of court's patronage since Prapanca wrote them incognito after he retired from the court.

One of the religious practices of the Majapahit royal family was the "royal walkabout".  They visited cornerstones of the empire and paid homage to the ancestors of the king. The poem also describes the death of Hayam Wuruk's most trusted regent, Gajah Mada.

The Queen Grandmother Rajapatni had a special place in Prapanca's poem. In one stanza, the poem describes the Queen Grandmother as chattra ning rat wisesa (the eminent protector of the world). Rajapatni was the progenitor of the Majapahit kingdom, because she was the daughter of Kertanegara, the last king of the Singhasari kingdom, and she was also the wife of Raden Wijaya, the founder of Majapahit.  Thus she was seen as the protector of the world.  The Queen Grandmother is said in the poem to embody the Pramabhagavati; Bhagavati is another name of Prajnaparamita (the Goddess of Wisdom in Mahayana).

The poem portrays Kertanegara as a staunch Buddhist, described as "submissive at the Feet of the Illustrious Shakya-Lion". Upon his death, the poem  describes the deification of Kertanegara in three forms: a splendid Jina, an Ardhanarishvara, and an imposing Shiva-Buddha. Particularly for the Shiva–Buddha Deity, Prapanca praises him as "the honoured Illustrious Protector of Mountains, Protector of the protectorless.  He is surely, Ruler over the rulers of the world". The Shiva–Buddha Deity is neither Shiva nor Buddha, but the Lord of the Mountains, or the Supreme God of the Realm. This religious belief is indigenous to the Javanese people who combined the Deities of two religions, Hinduism and Buddhism, into the same God, the oneness of the Dharma, as is written in the Kakawin Sutasoma (see Bhinneka Tunggal Ika).  When Kertanegara was deified as Shiva–Buddha, he symbolised the collective powers of the God of the Realm.

See also
 Candi of Indonesia
 Indonesian Esoteric Buddhism
 Javanese culture
 Javanese historical texts
 Kakawin
 Kakawin Sutasoma
 Kejawèn
 Pararaton

Notes

References

Sources

Further reading

A complete translation from University of Hamburg, adapted from Pigeaud, Theodoor Gautier Thomas (1960). Java in the 14th Century: A Study in Cultural History, Volume I: Javanese Texts in Transcription (3rd (revised) ed.). The Hague: Martinus Nijhoff and Pigeaud, Theodoor Gautier Thomas (1960). Java in the 14th Century: A Study in Cultural History, Volume III: Translations (3rd (revised) ed.). The Hague: Martinus Nijhoff.
A Complete Transcription of Majapahit Royal Manuscript of Nagarakertagama from Jejak Nusantara , adapted from Muljana, Slamet (1979). Nagarakretagama dan Tafsir Sejarahnya. Bhratara Karya Aksara.  (in Indonesian)

Kakawin
Precolonial states of Indonesia
Hinduism in Indonesia
Hinduism in Malaysia
Hindu texts
Majapahit
Buddhist texts
Buddhism in Indonesia